Nonspecific dipeptidase may refer to:
 Membrane dipeptidase, an enzyme
 Cytosol nonspecific dipeptidase, an enzyme